Wangi-wangi Island is in the north-west cluster of the Tukangbesi Islands, and is the seat of the Wakatobi Regency, part of the province of Southeast Sulawesi. It covers an area of 191 km2 and had an estimated 60,000 inhabitants in mid 2021. To the west is the Gulf of Kolowana Watabo (Teluk Kolowana Watabo). The Wangi Wangi white-eye (Zosterops sp. nov.) is a recently discovered endangered bird on the island.

External links

Tukangbesi Islands
Islands of Sulawesi
Landforms of Southeast Sulawesi
Regency seats of Southeast Sulawesi
Uninhabited islands of Indonesia